Hygia is a large genus of Asian seed bugs in the tribe Colpurini, erected by Philip Reese Uhler in 1861.

Species
The Coreoidea Species File lists:

subgenus Australocolpura Brailovsky, 1993
 Hygia sandaracine Brailovsky, 1993
subgenus Caracolpura Breddin, 1900
 Hygia planiceps (Breddin, 1900)
subgenus Colpura Bergroth, 1894
 Hygia afflicta (Walker, 1871)
 Hygia bidentata Ren, 1987
 Hygia bituberosa Ren & Jin, 1985
 Hygia breddini (Bergroth, 1906)
 Hygia capitata Ren & Jin, 1985
 Hygia cornosa Ren, 1987
 Hygia fasciiger Hsiao, 1964
 Hygia funebris (Distant, 1901)
 Hygia funesta Hsiao, 1964
 Hygia hainana Hsiao, 1964
 Hygia lata Hsiao, 1964
 Hygia lativentris (Motschulsky, 1866)
 Hygia lobata Ren, 1987
 Hygia luteifusula (Breddin, 1900)
 Hygia nana Hsiao, 1964
 Hygia nigrifusula (Breddin, 1900)
 Hygia notata Ren & Jin, 1985
 Hygia obscura (Dallas, 1852)
 Hygia omeia Hsiao, 1963
 Hygia pallidicornis (Stål, 1871)
 Hygia rostrata Hsiao, 1964
 Hygia simalurensis Blöte, 1936
 Hygia simulans Hsiao, 1964
 Hygia sulcata (Paiva, 1919)
 Hygia turpis (Walker, 1871)
 Hygia unicolor Ren, 1987
 Hygia wulingana Ren, 1993
 Hygia yunnana Hsiao, 1964
subgenus Eucolpura Breddin, 1900
 Hygia cassisi Brailovsky, 2004
 Hygia dolens Breddin, 1906
 Hygia heveli Brailovsky & Barrera, 1997
 Hygia lugubris (Walker, 1871)
 Hygia melas Brailovsky & Barrera, 1997
 Hygia moesta (Walker, 1871)
 Hygia scrutatrix (Breddin, 1900)
 Hygia severa (Breddin, 1906)
subgenus Hygia Uhler, 1861
 Hygia diplochela (Bergroth, 1921)
 Hygia erebus (Distant, 1901)
 Hygia magna Hsiao, 1964
 Hygia opaca (Uhler, 1860)
 Hygia pedestris Blöte, 1936
 Hygia pusilla Ren, 1987
 Hygia rosacea Ren, 1987
 Hygia signata Ren, 1987
subgenus Microcolpura Breddin, 1900
 Hygia binaluana Brailovsky & Barrera, 2005
 Hygia dulita Brailovsky, 2002
 Hygia flavitarsis Blöte, 1936
 Hygia hebeticollis (Breddin, 1905)
 Hygia humilis Breddin, 1906
 Hygia imbellis (Breddin, 1900)
 Hygia incultus Brailovsky & Barrera, 2005
 Hygia inermicollis (Breddin, 1900)
 Hygia inermis (Walker, 1871)
 Hygia labecula (Distant, 1901)
 Hygia modesta (Distant, 1901)
 Hygia pacalis (Breddin, 1906)
 Hygia selangorana Brailovsky & Barrera, 2005
 Hygia siberuta Brailovsky, 2002
 Hygia siporana Brailovsky, 2002
 Hygia speculigera (Breddin, 1906)
 Hygia terebrans (Breddin, 1906)
subgenus Pterocolpura Blöte, 1936
 Hygia alta Brailovsky & Barrera, 2006
 Hygia angulicollis (Breddin, 1900)
 Hygia annulipes (Dallas, 1852)
 Hygia anthrax Brailovsky, 2006
 Hygia armillata (Breddin, 1900)
 Hygia borneensis Brailovsky & Barrera, 2006
 Hygia brevipennis (Bergroth, 1921)
 Hygia denticollis (Bergroth, 1918)
 Hygia diaphora Brailovsky, 2006
 Hygia frontalis Brailovsky & Barrera, 2005
 Hygia kinabaluna Brailovsky, 2002
 Hygia mjobergi Brailovsky & Barrera, 2006
 Hygia montana Blöte, 1936
 Hygia murundina Brailovsky & Barrera, 2006
 Hygia noctua (Distant, 1901)
 Hygia nodulosa (Distant, 1889)
 Hygia pajuana Brailovsky, 2002
 Hygia pentafurcata Brailovsky, 2002
 Hygia reyesi Brailovsky & Barrera, 2006
 Hygia sarawak Brailovsky, 2002
 Hygia sylvestris Brailovsky, 2006
 Hygia tomokunii Brailovsky & Barrera, 2006
 Hygia tuberculicollis (Breddin, 1900)
 Hygia vantoli Brailovsky & Barrera, 2006
 Hygia varipes (Westwood, 1842)
 Hygia webbi Brailovsky & Barrera, 2006
subgenus Sphinctocolpura Breddin, 1900
 Hygia alvarezi Brailovsky, 2004
 Hygia conspersipes (Breddin, 1901)
 Hygia dentifer (Stål, 1871)
 Hygia dumoga Brailovsky, 2000
 Hygia forsteniana Blöte, 1936
 Hygia guttatipes (Breddin, 1901)
 Hygia lepida Brailovsky, 2000
 Hygia maculipes (Stål, 1871)
 Hygia minahassae Blöte, 1936
 Hygia obscuripes (Stål, 1871)
 Hygia oligotricha Brailovsky, 2004
 Hygia palumae Brailovsky, 2000
 Hygia pictipes (Stål, 1871)
 Hygia presigna Brailovsky, 2000
 Hygia pronotata Brailovsky, 2000
 Hygia punctipes (Stål, 1871)
 Hygia roratipes (Breddin, 1901)
 Hygia scitula Brailovsky, 2000
 Hygia tengaha Brailovsky, 2000
 Hygia terminalis Brailovsky, 2000
 Hygia utaranus Brailovsky, 2000
subgenus Stenocolpura Breddin, 1900
 Hygia annulata (Bergroth, 1921)
 Hygia javanensis (Distant, 1901)
 Hygia nugax (Breddin, 1906)
 Hygia stenocephala (Breddin, 1900)
 Hygia stenocephaloides (Breddin, 1900)
subgenus Trichocolpura Breddin, 1900
 Hygia blotei Brailovsky, 1990
 Hygia cliens Dolling, 1987
 Hygia schultheissi (Breddin, 1900)

References

External links
 Images at Crystal: Hygia lativentris
 

Coreinae
Coreidae genera